Lydia Kompe (née Ngwenya) born 1935 is a trade unionist and politician in South Africa. She has also been active in supporting women in rural communities.

Biography 
Kompe was born in Matlala, near Pietersburg in 1935. After the "betterment scheme" of 1950, there was no way for Kompe's family to make a living through farming, so she went to work in Johannesburg. In Johannesburg, she began to work in factories and eventually became involved with trade unions.

She said of the Metal and Allied Workers Union, which she joined in 1974, that "women were not seen as equal to men." When she was fired from her job in 1977, after a strike, she became a full-time employee of the union. Kompe was the only woman organizer at the time. During her time in the union, she faced sexist attitudes which she "was able to successfully put an end to." In 1982, she helped organize women cleaners, who often worked the night shift and who had been forced to trade sexual favors for keeping their jobs.

After the Congress of South African Trade Unions (Cosatu) was formed, Kompe moved back to a rural community. Kompe joined the Transvaal Rural Action Committee (TRAC) as a fieldworker in 1986. She later helped start the Rural Women's Movement (RWM), which was "formally launched in 1990."

Kompe became a member of Parliament in 1994 where she was on the Agriculture and Land Affairs Portfolio Committee. She was heavily involved with the Restitution Bill which worked to "offer a solution to people who had lost their land as a result of racially discriminatory practices." Kompe said, "When the Restitution Bill came up, I could talk from experience about the importance of women being included in that legislation." Her work with the Joint Monitoring Committee on the Improvement of the Quality of Life and Status of Women helped support the Maintenance Bill, which would ensure that customary marriages were recognized by the state. As a member of Parliament, she feels that her participation has helped "women of her area the courage to speak out" and make demands for equality.

References

Citations

Sources

External links 
 Interview

1935 births
South African women trade unionists
People from Polokwane
South African women in politics
Living people